Linus and Lucy: The Music of Vince Guaraldi is the tenth album by pianist George Winston, released in 1996. It features covers of songs composed by jazz pianist Vince Guaraldi, including some written for the Peanuts animations. It was reissued on Dancing Cat Records in 2008. The album was certified Gold by the RIAA on November 19, 1996.

Winston released a second volume of Guaraldi compositions in 2010, entitled Love Will Come: The Music of Vince Guaraldi, Volume 2.

Track listing 

† = denotes song has not been commercially released; featured in Peanuts television special only

References

External links
 Liner notes

1996 albums
George Winston albums
Vince Guaraldi tribute albums
Peanuts music
Dancing Cat Records albums
Windham Hill Records albums